High Energy is a studio album recorded in 1974 by jazz trumpeter Freddie Hubbard. It was first studio album released on the Columbia label and features performances by Hubbard, Joe Sample, George Cables, Junior Cook, Ernie Watts, Pete Christlieb, and Ian Underwood.

Reception
A reviewer of Dusty Groove wrote "Sweet electric Freddie Hubbard – a wonderfully laidback session that's filled with space and soul – hardly what you'd expect from the title! The album follows nicely in the style that Hubbard hit at CTI – an openly flowing groove that has Freddie's trumpet on top of long electric piano lines from George Cables, with occasional fuller backings to flesh out the sound! Arrangements are by Dale Oehler, who's conducting a larger group behind a core quintet that also features excellent reeds from Junior Cook – possibly one of his strongest (and only) appearances on an electric date like this. Cables is the champ, though – and really makes the set cook by changing the vibe strongly with his keys – setting a tone for Freddie throughout." AllMusic's Scott Yanow commented One of Freddie Hubbard's few decent efforts during his very commercial period with Columbia, this LP found his quintet (with tenor-saxophonist Junior Cook and keyboardist George Cables) joined by a small orchestra and a string section on a set of potentially dismal material."

Track listing
 "Camel Rise" (George Cables) - 6:21
 "Black Maybe" (Wonder) - 4:55
 "Baraka Sasa" (Hubbard) - 10:26
 "Crisis" (Hubbard) - 5:45
 "Ebony Moonbeams" (Cables) - 6:57
 "Too High" (Wonder) - 6:35

Personnel
Freddie Hubbard: trumpet, flugelhorn
Junior Cook: tenor saxophone (6), flute
Dick "Slyde" Hyde, George Bohanon: trombone
Pete Christlieb: tenor saxophone (6), bass clarinet (5)
Ernie Watts: bass flute (1), flute (6), soprano saxophone (5)
Dean Parks: guitar
George Cables: electric piano
Joe Sample: clavinet, organ
Ian Underwood: synthesizer
Kent Brinkley: bass
Harvey Mason (2, 4), Ralph Penland (1, 3, 5-6): drums
Victor Feldman, King Errison, Carmelo Garcia: percussion
Dale Oehler: arrangements, conducting

References

Freddie Hubbard albums
1974 albums
Albums produced by Paul A. Rothchild
Columbia Records albums